Destroyer (also known as Shadow of Death) is a 1988 American slasher film directed by Robert Kirk, and starring Lyle Alzado, Clayton Rohner, Deborah Foreman, and Anthony Perkins.

Plot

Ivan Moser (Lyle Alzado) is a serial killer who has been convicted of the rape, torture, and murder of 23 people. Moser is given the death penalty by electrocution. At his execution, he boasts of having killed 24 people. A power outage caused by a riot prevents the execution, but Moser receives a jolt of electricity before the power fails. The prison staff assumes that Moser is killed during the riot, but he manages to escape. The prison subsequently is abandoned. Moser lives within the abandoned prison with the assistance of his father, who had been employed as a guard. Eighteen months later, a film crew arrives at the prison to shoot an exploitation film entitled Death House Dollies. They discover that Moser survived his electrocution due to an unusual genetic gift. The jolt of electrical energy made him "half-alive", leaving him in a feral state and granting him spontaneous regeneration.

Cast
 Deborah Foreman as Susan Malone
 Clayton Rohner as David Harris
 Lyle Alzado as Ivan Moser
 Anthony Perkins as Robert Edwards

Theatrical release and home media
The film was released theatrically in the United States by The Movie Store on September 28, 1988. It was also released on VHS and LaserDisc by Virgin Vision that same year.

Scream Factory released the film on Blu-ray in a double feature with Edge of Sanity in 2016.

Reception
Although the cast was praised, particularly Alzado and Perkins, the film received mostly negative reviews.

David Nusair of Reel Film Reviews was disappointed by the film, gave it 2 out of 4 and wrote: "Rarely as much fun as one might've anticipated (and hoped)..."

References

External links 
 
 

1988 films
1988 horror films
1980s slasher films
American serial killer films
American action horror films
American supernatural horror films
American prison films
American slasher films
1980s English-language films
1980s American films